Nemanja Sekulić (born 29 March 1994) is a Montenegrin football midfielder who plays for Budućnost Podgorica.

International career
He made his Montenegro national football team debut on 11 October 2019 in a Euro 2020 qualifier against Bulgaria. He started the game and played the whole match.

References

External links
 
 
 Nemanja Sekulić stats at utakmica.rs 
 

1994 births
Living people
Footballers from Podgorica
Association football midfielders
Montenegrin footballers
Montenegro international footballers
FK Vojvodina players
FK Rudar Pljevlja players
OFK Petrovac players
FK Bratstvo Cijevna players
FK Zeta players
FK Kom players
FK Budućnost Podgorica players
Serbian SuperLiga players
Montenegrin First League players
Montenegrin Second League players
Montenegrin expatriate footballers
Expatriate footballers in Serbia
Montenegrin expatriate sportspeople in Serbia